A list of films produced in Pakistan in 1955:

1955

See also
1955 in Pakistan

External links
 Search Pakistani film - IMDB.com

1955
Pakistani
Films